Jean-Jacques Fussien (21 January 1952 – 23 August 1978) was a French cyclist. He competed in the team pursuit event at the 1972 Summer Olympics.

References

External links
 

1952 births
1978 deaths
French male cyclists
Olympic cyclists of France
Cyclists at the 1972 Summer Olympics
Sportspeople from Oise
French track cyclists
Cyclists from Hauts-de-France
20th-century French people